Rais Shaikh (born 1 June 1974) is an Indian politician from Mumbai, India. He is a member of Maharashtra Legislative Assembly representing the constituency of Bhiwandi East. He has been the Municipal Councilor and also the Group Leader of the Samajwadi Party. He contested and won the BMC elections from Govandi in 2012 and Nagpada in 2017. Shaikh was also amongst the top 10 corporators in Mumbai as per a survey by Mumbai Mirror.

In the last election, Rais Shaikh won the Bhiwandi East seat by 45,133 votes. He defeated Rupesh Laxman Mhatre of Shiv Sena and Santosh Shetty of Congress.

Early life and education
Rais was born (Father: Kasam Shaikh, Mother: Zainab Shaikh) in a middle-class family in Mandvi Suburb of Mumbai, Maharashtra on 1 June 1974. Rais had 6 siblings, all of whom were males. He was the second youngest son of his parents. He received his education from Dawoodbhoy Fazalbhoy High School and Lala Lajpatrai College in Mumbai. He graduated with a degree in Bachelor of Commerce from Sydenham College of Commerce and Economics which is affiliated to Mumbai University.

Career
Rais started his career as a computer teacher and later worked at a printing press in Mumbai soon after completing his graduation. Between 2002-07, he was based in Dubai and trying to build a career there. In his free time, he would do translation work for NGOs based in Mumbai. That served as an awakening for him. He moved back to India and decided to work towards the betterment of society as an activist.

Political life
Rais embarked upon his political career in the year 2012 by joining the Samajwadi Party.

Civis Issues 
Shaikh has worked to maintain and construct dilapidated roads, resolve water shortage problems not only in his ward but the entire area of Govandi. He has multiple goals that include providing digital classrooms to all schools, setting up technology to enable virtual autopsies in post-mortem centers and has proposed to provide online birth and death certificates and underground parking below open spaces in South Mumbai.
Shaikh's Ahtesaab Foundation has provided the first digital classroom of this city to a School in Govandi. He believes that there is a need to do something about the traffic congestion in Mumbai and hence suggested to start Mini Bus services. He has also presented a program to improve slum infrastructure.

Education 
An English medium school run by BMC with support from NGO Ahtesaab to serve the growing needs of parents in the area who wanted to send their children to an English medium school. 
He introduced  Digital Learning where he developed 2 classrooms each in Govandi and Madanpura as modern digital classrooms. He also proposed the Semi English format of Education in BMC and introduced an all-English School by the name of Umar Rajjab Public School.

Healthcare 
In 2018, Rais Shaikh, as a councilor, sanctioned of two crores and seventy-five lacs to renovate the Mukti Fauj Dawakhana (Salvation Army Dispensary), one of the oldest dispensaries in the city.

Stance Against Drugs 
On September 9, 2018, Rais Shaik led a rally with party members and people from his constituency to protest against the illegal sale and consumption of drugs. The rally covered different areas like Madanpura, Nagpada, and Byculla.

Demand for a Pay Hike For Corporators 
Rais asked for a hike in the salaries of corporators in May 2017. He demanded corporators to be paid a salary of Rs. 50, 000. At that time, corporators were being paid a salary of Rs. 10, 000. A corporator, as a part of his or her duty, has to be on the move all the time and have to meet people from different areas on a regular basis to address their problems. While condemning corruption in politics, Rais stated that corporators must be paid the kind of amount that would not at least not make them worried about managing their personal expenses.

Women Empowerment and Safety 
Rais advocated the implementation of some measures with the help of which the situation can be improved. Rais and his team carried out an initiative called ‘Police Didi’ under which four female constables spoke to the girls and the women in these areas. Several men were arrested because of the testimonies by these women. Rais has demanded for the formation of a monitoring committee for the police budget.

Poverty Advocacy 
 In May 2019, Shaikh was able to help several families who were living in slums to apply for housing aid from the government. The families  were issued with allotment letters and given flats in different areas.

Condemnation on 2020 Hathras Gang Rape and Murder 
Rais Shaikh strongly criticized the gang rape and murder incident that took place in Hathras district in Uttar Pradesh. In an interview, Rais criticized the ruling government of Uttar Pradesh sharply and stated that the cover-up that happened after the incident was a glaring example of the incompetence of the government.

Burial Controversy During Covid-19 
On March 30, 2020, Municipal Commissioner Praveen Pardeshi stated that people who die of Coronavirus should be cremated and not buried, irrespective of their religion. Asif Zakaria, corporator from Bandra, informed Rais about this advisory. There was a vague line in the advisory which states that those who want to bury their relatives or family members should go out of Mumbai. Rais opposed this and said it was unreasonable and highly discriminatory against one religion. The circular was amended and the revised version which was published stated that dead bodies can be buried in crematoriums.

One-rupee Clinic 
Rais introduced the concept of a one-rupee clinic in Bhiwandi and also initiated a door to door campaign right from the early days of the pandemic hitting the country. Under this campaign, the oxygen level of every individual was examined. All the other necessary tests to check the symptoms of Covid-19 were done. After doing these tests, one could see the result in 15 minutes.

References

External links
 Rais Shaikh’s Official Website
 
 
 
 

Samajwadi Party politicians
Living people
1974 births
21st-century Indian Muslims
Maharashtra politicians
21st-century Indian politicians
People from Mumbai Suburban district